Salem Union Church and Cemetery, also known as Salem Lutheran Church and Salem United Church of Christ, is a historic United Church of Christ church and cemetery located near Maiden, Lincoln County, North Carolina.  The church was built in 1849 as a simple rectangular brick building, and enlarged and remodeled in the Late Gothic Revival style in 1914–1915.  With the remodeling, a two-stage corner tower was added and the window and door openings converted to lancet-arch openings. A two-story Sunday School addition was built in 1936-1937 and in 1989 a Fellowship Hall was built to form an "H"-shaped church building.  Also on the property is a contributing well shed (c. 1928) and cemetery with burials dating to 1792.

It was listed on the National Register of Historic Places in 1995.

References

Lutheran churches in North Carolina
United Church of Christ churches in North Carolina
Churches on the National Register of Historic Places in North Carolina
Gothic Revival church buildings in North Carolina
Churches completed in 1849
Churches in Lincoln County, North Carolina
National Register of Historic Places in Lincoln County, North Carolina
1849 establishments in North Carolina